Switzerland competed at the 2022 World Games held in Birmingham, United States from 7 to 17 July 2022. Athletes representing Switzerland won five gold medals, four silver medals and three bronze medals. The country finished in 15th place in the medal table.

Medalists

Competitors
The following is the list of number of competitors in the Games.

Archery

Switzerland competed in archery.

Dancesport

Switzerland won one silver medal in dancesport.

Duathlon

Switzerland competed in duathlon.

Fistball

Switzerland won the silver medal in both the men's and women's fistball tournaments.

Floorball

Switzerland competed in the floorball tournament.

Summary

Group play

Fifth place game

Inline hockey

Switzerland competed in the inline hockey tournament.

Ju-jitsu

Switzerland won one bronze medal in ju-jitsu.

Karate

Switzerland competed in karate.

Men

Women

Orienteering

Switzerland won five medals in orienteering.

Sport climbing

Switzerland won one gold medal in sport climbing.

Squash

Switzerland competed in squash.

Tug of war

Switzerland won two medals in tug of war.

Water skiing

One competitor was scheduled to represent Switzerland in water skiing. He did not start in his event.

Wheelchair rugby

Switzerland competed in wheelchair rugby.

Wushu

Switzerland competed in wushu.

References

Nations at the 2022 World Games
2022
World Games